The  is a tracked armored personnel carrier that entered service with Japan Ground Self-Defense Force in 1973. In 1996 the JGSDF adopted the wheeled Type 96 Armored Personnel Carrier to supplement the Type 73.

Development 
The Defense Agency's Technical Research and Development Institution issued a requirement for a new APC to replace the Type 60 APC in 1967. Among the requirements included a maximum speed of over 60 km/h, ability to carry 12 men including the crew, to be fully amphibious, have all-welded aluminium armor, provision for the infantry to use their small arms from inside the vehicle and be armed with a 20 mm cannon, a 12.7 mm machine gun and a 7.62 mm machine gun. An automotive test rig, called the SUT, was built in 1968. Komatsu and Mitsubishi Heavy Industries each built two prototypes the following year, one each in steel and aluminium. Mitsubishi's aluminium model was chosen for use in December 1973.

Description 
The Type 73 is almost unique in that it uses a mid-engined V4 layout, as the driver and bow machine gunner are in the front of the vehicle. The commander sits slightly behind the bow gunner while the gunner sits behind the driver. The engine is mounted on the left side behind the bow gunner with both its air intake and exhaust on the top of the vehicle. The engine and transmission are designed to be easily removed as one complete unit. The gunner's cupola can traverse a full 360°, but the bow gunner's weapon can only traverse, elevate and depress 30°. It is fitted with six smoke dischargers, three on each side. Its infantry can fire their personal weapons from inside the vehicle. It is fitted with infra-red driving lights and an NBC system.

Variants 
A command version is in service with a raised roof. The Type 73's chassis served has been adapted for use by the Type 75 130 mm Multiple Rocket Launcher, its companion Type 75 wind measurement vehicle and the Type 74 105 mm Self-propelled howitzer.

Status
As of 2001, Japan reported to the United Nations Office for Disarmament Affairs that 337 Type 73s were in service, although it seems unlikely to be fully superseded as a tracked personnel carrier due to the Type 89's slow production rate.

Notes

References 
 Chant, Christopher. A Compendium of Armaments and Military Hardware. New York and London: Routledge & Kegan Paul, 1987 , p. 51-2

External links
 Type 73 on military-today.com
 Type 73 on deagel.com
 Type 73 on OnWar.com 
 excerpt from Jane's Armour and Artillery 2008

Japan Ground Self-Defense Force
Armoured personnel carriers of the Cold War
Tracked armoured personnel carriers
Cold War military equipment of Japan
Armoured personnel carriers of Japan
Military vehicles introduced in the 1970s
Amphibious armoured personnel carriers